Is the World Strange or Am I Strange? is the second album by English singer-songwriter Cosmo Jarvis. It was released on 26 September 2011. Four songs from the album have been released as singles: "Gay Pirates", "Sure as Hell Not Jesus", "My Day" and "She Doesn't Mind".

Track listing

External links
 Is The World Strange Or Am I?, Discogs

2011 albums
Cosmo Jarvis albums